West Bengal Socialist Party (WBSP) was a political party in the Indian state of West Bengal. WBSP was formed when the Bengali socialists in the then Janata Party split in the beginning of the 1980s (the other faction became the Democratic Socialist Party). WBSP was a part of Left Front. The party leader, Kiranmoy Nanda, was the Fisheries Minister in the West Bengal government.

The party upheld the ideals of Jayaprakash Narayan, Ram Manohar Lohia and Narendra Dev.

In 1990s, the party merged with the Samajwadi Party of Mulayam Singh Yadav. Kiranmoy Nanda became one of the national secretaries of SP. But due to the differences between SP and the Communists in April, 1999 over supporting Congress in forming a government after the defeat of the Vajpayee government in the trust vote, WBSP was resurrected once again.

In the state assembly elections 2001 WBSP launched four candidates, supported by Left Front. All four got elected. In total the party received 246 407 votes. In 2005 municipal polls in Kolkata, WBSP contested 2 seats (ward no. 55 and 63) as a part of LF. It lost in both seats.

In the 2006 West Bengal state assembly election, WBSP retained its four seats.
Senor leaders of the party included Moni Pal and Jonmejay Ojha. The party has influences in parts of East Midnapore, Malda, Nadia and Murshidabad.

In 2008 Panchayat Elections, it has secured a zilla parishad seat in Malda.
It won 2 municipality seats in the Krishnagar municipality in 2008.

In April 2010, WBSP merged with the Samajwadi Party of Mulayam Singh Yadav. Kiranmoy Nanda again became a general secretary of SP.

References

Defunct political parties in West Bengal
Defunct socialist parties in India
Political parties established in the 1980s
1980s establishments in West Bengal
Political parties disestablished in 2010
2010 disestablishments in India